The role of social media in the Arab Spring, a revolutionary wave of demonstrations and protests in the Middle East and North Africa between 2010 and 2012, remains a highly debated subject. Uprisings occurred in states regardless of their levels of Internet usage, with some states with high levels of Internet usage (such as Bahrain, with 88% of its population online in 2011) experiencing uprisings as well as states with low levels of Internet usage (such as Yemen and Libya).

Acknowledgement of the role of social media during the Arab Spring

Social media played a significant role facilitating communication and interaction among participants of political protests. Protesters used social media to organize demonstrations (both pro- and anti-governmental), disseminate information about their activities, and raise local and global awareness of ongoing events. Research from the Project on Information Technology and Political Islam found that online revolutionary conversations often preceded mass protests on the ground, and that social media played a central role in shaping political debates in the Arab Spring. Governments used social media to engage with citizens and encourage their participation in government processes; in others, governments monitored internet traffic or blocked access to websites, and in the case of Egypt cut off access to the internet, as part of the government's attempts to prevent uprisings. As a result of their research many academics have concluded that social media played a critical role in "mobilization, empowerment, shaping opinions, and influencing change" during the Arab Spring.

Uneven impact of social media on political processes
Social media's impact varied per country. Social networks played an important role in the rapid and relatively peaceful disintegration of at least two regimes in Tunisia and Egypt, where the governing regimes had little or no social base. They also contributed to social and political mobilization in Syria and Bahrain, where the Syrian Electronic Army, a still active Syrian "hacktivist" group, was established in order to target and launch cyber attacks against the political opposition and news websites.

While nine out of ten Egyptians and Tunisians responded to a poll that they used Facebook to organise protests and spread awareness, the role of the social network wasn't central in countries like Syria and Yemen, where there is little Facebook usage. During the Arab Spring the number of users of social networks, especially Facebook, rose dramatically in most Arab countries, particularly in those where political uprising took place, with the exception of Libya, which at the time had low Internet access preventing people from doing so.

As previously mentioned government reactions to social media activism differed significantly from country to country. While the Tunisian government blocked only certain routes and websites through which protests were coordinated, the Egyptian government went further, first blocking Facebook and Twitter, then completely blocking access to the internet in the country by shutting down the 4 national ISPs and all mobile phone networks on January 28, 2011. The Internet blackout in Egypt failed to stop the protests, and instead seemed to fuel them. However, because these censorship measures did not prevent the overthrowing of the Egyptian and Tunisian governments, some argue that social media's role in the Arab Spring is overplayed, that other social and political factors were likely at play.

Origins of the social media movement in Arab nations 
In the aftermath of the Tunisian Revolution, young Egyptians spread the call to protest online with the help of a Facebook campaign, "We Are All Khaled Said,"  organized by the April 6 Youth Movement, Egypt's "largest and most active online human-right activist group." As the call to protest spread, online dissent moved into the offline world. The profile of the most active users of social networks (young, urban, and relatively educated) matches the description of the first anti-government protesters that emerged in the country in January 2011. As such some analysts have used this to argue that the Arab Spring truly began as a youth revolution meant to "promote a collective identity" and "mobilize people online and offline".

Other instruments of coordination used during the Arab Spring
Social networks were not the only instruments available for rebels to communicate their efforts, with protesters in countries with limited internet access, such as Yemen and Libya, using electronic media devices like cell phones, emails, and video clips (e.g. YouTube) to coordinate and attract international support. In Egypt, and particularly in Cairo, mosques were one of the main platforms to coordinate protests. Television was also used to inform and coordinate the public in some countries.

Criticism of social media's role in the Arab Spring
According to some experts, the initial excitement over the role of social media in political processes in the countries of the Maghreb and the Middle East has diminished. As Ekaterina Stepanova argues in her study concerning the role of information and communications technologies in the Arab Spring, social networks largely contributed to political and social mobilisation but didn't play a decisive and independent role in it. Instead, social media acted as a catalyst for revolution, as in the case of Egypt, where the existing gap between the ruling elite and the rest of the population would eventually have resulted in some kind of uprising.

References

Arab Spring and the media